These are the official results of the Men's 20 km walk event at the 1986 European Championships in Stuttgart, West Germany, held on 27 August 1986.

Medalists

Final

Participation
According to an unofficial count, 22 athletes from 13 countries participated in the event.

 (1)
 (3)
 (2)
 (1)
 (1)
 (1)
 (3)
 (1)
 (1)
 (3)
 (2)
 (2)
 (1)

See also
 1980 Men's Olympic 20km Walk (Moscow)
 1982 Men's European Championships 20km Walk (Athens)
 1983 Men's World Championships 20km Walk (Helsinki)
 1984 Men's Olympic 20km Walk (Los Angeles)
 1987 Men's World Championships 20km Walk (Rome)
 1988 Men's Olympic 20km Walk (Seoul)
 1990 Men's European Championships 20km Walk (Split)

References

External links
 Results

Walk 20 km
Racewalking at the European Athletics Championships